Jason Alexander (born on 22 September 2000) is a South African rugby union player for the  in the Currie Cup. His regular position is hooker.

Alexander was named in the  squad for the 2021 Currie Cup Premier Division. He made his debut for Western Province in Round 2 of the 2021 Currie Cup Premier Division against .

References

South African rugby union players
Living people
Rugby union hookers
Western Province (rugby union) players
2000 births
Sharks (Currie Cup) players